The 2019 India Open (officially known as the Yonex-Sunrise India Open 2019 for sponsorship reasons) was a badminton tournament which took place at K. D. Jadhav Indoor Hall in India from 26 to 31 March 2019 and had a total purse of $350,000.

Tournament
The 2019 India Open was the eighth tournament of the 2019 BWF World Tour and also part of the India Open championships, which had been held since 2008. This tournament was organized by the Badminton Association of India with sanction from the BWF.

Venue
This international tournament was held at K. D. Jadhav Indoor Hall in New Delhi, India.

Point distribution
Below is the point distribution table for each phase of the tournament based on the BWF points system for the BWF World Tour Super 500 event.

Prize money
The total prize money for this tournament was US$350,000. Distribution of prize money was in accordance with BWF regulations.

Men's singles

Seeds

 Shi Yuqi (withdrew)
 Viktor Axelsen (champion)
 Srikanth Kidambi (final)
 Tommy Sugiarto (first round)
 Sameer Verma (second round)
 Ng Ka Long (withdrew)
 Khosit Phetpradab (quarter-finals)
 Kantaphon Wangcharoen (first round)

Finals

Top half

Section 1

Section 2

Bottom half

Section 3

Section 4

Women's singles

Seeds

 Chen Yufei (withdrew)
 P. V. Sindhu (semi-finals)
 He Bingjiao (final)
 Ratchanok Intanon (champion)
 Saina Nehwal (withdrew)
 Zhang Beiwen (quarter-finals)
 Han Yue (semi-finals)
 Mia Blichfeldt (quarter-finals)

Finals

Top half

Section 1

Section 2

Bottom half

Section 3

Section 4

Men's doubles

Seeds

 Kim Astrup / Anders Skaarup Rasmussen (semi-finals)
 Goh V Shem / Tan Wee Kiong (first round)
 Satwiksairaj Rankireddy / Chirag Shetty (withdrew)
 Vladimir Ivanov / Ivan Sozonov (first round)
 Ou Xuanyi / Ren Xiangyu (quarter-finals)
 Manu Attri / B. Sumeeth Reddy (semi-finals)
 Mohamad Arif Abdul Latif / Nur Mohd Azriyn Ayub (quarter-finals)
 Bodin Isara / Maneepong Jongjit (withdrew)

Finals

Top half

Section 1

Section 2

Bottom half

Section 3

Section 4

Women's doubles

Seeds

 Greysia Polii / Apriyani Rahayu (champions)
 Jongkolphan Kititharakul / Rawinda Prajongjai (semi-finals)
 Chow Mei Kuan / Lee Meng Yean (final)
 Vivian Hoo / Yap Cheng Wen (quarter-finals)
 Puttita Supajirakul / Sapsiree Taerattanachai (withdrew)
 Li Wenmei / Zheng Yu (first round)
 Ni Ketut Mahadewi Istarani / Rizki Amelia Pradipta (first round)
 Chayanit Chaladchalam / Phataimas Muenwong (quarter-finals)

Finals

Top half

Section 1

Section 2

Bottom half

Section 3

Section 4

Mixed doubles

Seeds

 Wang Yilyu / Huang Dongping (champions)
 Dechapol Puavaranukroh / Sapsiree Taerattanachai (withdrew)
 Mathias Christiansen / Christina Pedersen (withdrew)
 Hafiz Faizal / Gloria Emanuelle Widjaja (semi-finals)
 Praveen Jordan / Melati Daeva Oktavianti (final)
 Lu Kai / Chen Lu (second round)
 Nipitphon Phuangphuapet / Savitree Amitrapai (quarter-finals)
 Satwiksairaj Rankireddy / Ashwini Ponnappa (withdrew)

Finals

Top half

Section 1

Section 2

Bottom half

Section 3

Section 4

References

External links
 Tournament Link

India Open (badminton)
India Open
India Open
India Open